Giulio Gazzotti (born September 23, 1991) is an Italian professional basketball player for Pallacanestro Forlì of the Italian Serie A2 Basket.

References

External links 
Eurobasket.com Profile

1991 births
Living people
Italian men's basketball players
Lega Basket Serie A players
Power forwards (basketball)
Sportspeople from Bologna
Vanoli Cremona players
Victoria Libertas Pallacanestro players
Virtus Bologna players